Burton R. Lifland was an American federal bankruptcy judge who ruled over the aftermath of the Bernie Madoff ponzi scheme, among many other influential cases.

References

Judges of the United States bankruptcy courts
2014 deaths
Year of birth missing